The 99th United States Congress began on January 3, 1985. There were five new senators (three Democrats, two Republicans) and 41 new representatives (11 Democrats, 30 Republicans), as well as two new delegates (one Democrat, one Republican), at the start of the first session. Additionally, three senators (two Democrats, one Republican) and five representatives (four Democrats, one Republican) took office on various dates in order to fill vacancies during the 99th Congress before it ended on January 3, 1987.

Senate

Took office January 3, 1985

Took office during the 99th Congress

House of Representatives

Took office January 3, 1985

Non-voting members

Took office during the 99th Congress

See also 
 List of United States senators in the 99th Congress
 List of members of the United States House of Representatives in the 99th Congress by seniority

Notes

References 

99th United States Congress
99